Lucas Dias Pires de Oliveira (born 27 June 1995) is a Brazilian footballer  who plays for Rodos F.C., as a forward.

Football career
On 4 August 2013, Lucas made his professional debut with Sporting Covilhã in a 2013–14 Taça da Liga match against UD Oliveirense.

References

External links

Stats and profile at LPFP 

1995 births
Living people
Brazilian footballers
Association football forwards
Liga Portugal 2 players
S.C. Covilhã players
People from Anápolis
Sportspeople from Goiás